Kirill (Kyril or Kyrill) Rodin is a Russian cellist and professor of cello. Rodin performs as a soloist in the Moscow State Philharmonic and is the cellist of the Tchaikovsky String Quartet (commonly referred to as the Tchaikovsky Quartet or Tchaikovsky Quartette.) He has also performed as a member of the Brahms Trio with the pianist Natalia Rubinstein and violinist Nikolai Sachenko.

Early life and education
Born in Moscow in 1963, Rodin began his cello studies at the age of seven, as he participated in classes held by Vera Birina at the Gnessin Special Music School in Moscow. He then continued his studies with Natalia Shakhovskaya at the Moscow Conservatory. During his studies, he successfully participated in a number of music competitions. He won the first prize at the XIV Int. Jeunesses musicales competition (Belgrade, 1984, 1 prize and special prize Golden Harp, chairman of the jury was a great André Navarra). VIII International Tchaikovsky competition in Moscow, 1986 bring him First prize and Gold medal.

Career
Rodin has performed in 50 different countries on all five continents, including the United States, Japan, South Korea, Australia, Singapore, and New Zealand. While he travels to various countries to perform on stage, Rodin is a professor at the Moscow Tchaikovsky conservatory, teaches cello in China and held master classes in Germany, Australia, Spain, Argentina, Japan, South Korea, China and Australia. Some of his students include Aleksandr Neustroyev, Svetlana Vladimirova, Artem Konstantinov, and Ruslan Biryukov. Rodi n has served as a jury member in many international cello competitions.

Rodin's recordings include music of Bach, Beethoven, Brahms, Haydn, Grieg, Tchaikovsky, Rachmaninov, Shostakovitch, Khrennikov, Myaskovsky and Piazolla. He has also recorded modern Chinese music.

In 2016 Rodin participated in the Schwingungen Trio with violinist Sanghee Sania Cheong and pianist Sang-Eil Shin with whom he played Glinka's Trio Pathetique in D minor, Beethoven's Piano Trio in D major, and Piano Trio No. 1 in D minor by Anton Arensky.

References

Russian cellists
1963 births
Living people